Shree Antu is a Village / Valley within Suryodaya Municipality in Ilam District in the Province No. 1 of eastern Nepal. At the time of the 2011 Nepal census it had a population of 4,981.

Shree Antu is a popular tourist destination best known as the place to observe sunrise and is known for its tea gardens. 

A view tower has been constructed atop the Sri Antu Hill at an altitude of 2328 m above sea level.

Sri Antu shares a border with West Bengal, India.  Mostly Cool and breezy, this Village contains eye catching natural resources and attractive tourist destination for trekking, hiking or viewing sceneries.

Known for tea, cardamom, garlic etc, this place serves as very good producer of organic natural elements. Antu Pokhari, Bhanjyang, Chiruwa and lavishing tea gardens are some of its exotic places.

References

External links
 
UN map of the municipalities of Ilam District

Populated places in Ilam District